Thomas Farmer (ca. 1546–1621), of East Barsham, Norfolk, was an English politician.

He was a Member of Parliament (MP) for Norfolk in 1586.

References

1546 births
1621 deaths
People from North Norfolk (district)
English MPs 1586–1587
Alumni of St John's College, Cambridge
Members of the Parliament of England for Norfolk